Sphaenorhynchus  is a genus of frogs in the family Hylidae. They are also known as lime treefrogs or hatchet-faced treefrogs. They are found in the Amazon and Orinoco River basins of South America, the Guianas, Trinidad, and southern and eastern Brazil. The majority of the species are associated with the Atlantic Forest domain in Brazil.

Systematics
Sphaenorhynchus has been suggested to be the sister taxon of the clade Scarthyla + Scinax. Faivovich and colleagues (2005) placed it in the tribe Dendropsophini, together with Dendropsophus, Lysapsus, Pseudis, Scarthyla, Scinax, and Xenohyla.

Description
Sphaenorhynchus are small to moderately sized frogs. They are bright green or yellowish green in life. The snout is pointed and projecting in lateral view. Most species have well-developed horizontal dermal flaps on each side of the anus. The fingers are weakly webbed while the toes are extensively webbed. Males have a vocal sac on the posterior throat region.

Species
The following species are recognised in the genus Sphaenorhynchus:

References

 
Hylidae
Amphibian genera
Taxa named by Johann Jakob von Tschudi